Eisenhower High School can refer to the following schools in the United States:

 Eisenhower High School (Rialto, California)
 Eisenhower High School (Blue Island, Illinois)
 Eisenhower High School (Decatur, Illinois)
 Eisenhower High School (Kansas), Goddard, Kansas
 Eisenhower High School (Michigan), Shelby Township, Michigan
 Eisenhower High School (Lawton, Oklahoma)
 Eisenhower High School (Pennsylvania), Russell, Pennsylvania
 Eisenhower High School (Houston), Houston, Texas
 Eisenhower High School (Yakima, Washington)
 New Berlin Eisenhower Middle/High School, Wisconsin